FC Viktoria Köln is a German association football club from the city of Cologne in North Rhine-Westphalia, that competes in the 3. Liga.

History
Founded in 1904 as FC Germania Kalk it is one of the oldest football clubs in the city. In 1909 Germania merged with FC Kalk to form SV Kalk 04 and in 1911 this club was, in turn, united with Mülheimer FC to create VfR Mülheim-Kalk 04. The club was renamed VfR Köln 04 in 1918 and, in 1926, won its first Western German football championship and entry to national championship play.

After the re-organization of German football in 1933 under the Third Reich into sixteen top flight divisions, VfR played in the Gauliga Mittelrhein taking titles there in 1935 and 1937 but then performed poorly at the national level. In 1941 The Gauliga Mittelrhein was split into the Gauliga Moselland and Gauliga Köln-Aachen, with VfR playing in the latter division. Two years later the club joined Mülheimer SV to play as the combined wartime side (Kriegsspielgemeinschaft) KSG VfR 04 Köln/Mülheimer SV 06. Mülheim had also played in the Gauliga Mittelrhein since 1933 claiming titles of its own in 1934 and 1940, and had similarly poor results at the national level. Play in the Gauliga Köln-Aachen was suspended in the 1944–45 season as Allied armies advanced into Germany at the end of World War II.

After the war VfR Köln resumed playing first division football in the Oberliga West, but lasted only a single season before being relegated. In 1949 the team merged with its wartime partner Mülheimer SV to become SC Rapid Köln 04 and played in the 2. Oberliga West (II) until falling to third tier football after 1952. Rapid joined local rivals SC Preußen Dellbrück forming SC Viktoria 04 Köln in 1957. Of these sides, Preußen Dellbrück was most successful, advancing to the semi-finals of the national championships in 1950 before going out against Kickers Offenbach in a replay of their scoreless first match.

In 1963, the city selected Viktoria as its representative in the Fairs Cup, the forerunner of today's UEFA Cup, but the club was unable to capitalize on the opportunity. The team played as a second and third division side with generally unremarkable results until the 1994 merger with SC Brück that created SCB Preußen Köln, the new team being named after predecessor Preußen Dellbrück. The new club earned a second-place finish in their division in 2000, but quickly tumbled to the Oberliga Nordrhein (IV), even spending one season in fifth division Verbandsliga Mittelrhein. The pattern continued after the team was re-christened SCB Viktoria Köln in 2002.

On 22 June 2010, a new club called FC Viktoria Köln was founded which took over the youth teams of now insolvent SCB Viktoria Köln. Although it was expected that the new club can begin in the Landesliga, where SCB Viktoria had played at last, they were forced by the association to start in the lowest league, Kreisliga D. Nonetheless, on 24 February 2011 they took over FC Junkersdorf which became champion of the 2010–11 Mittelrheinliga and so FC Viktoria Köln could start in 2011–12 in the NRW-Liga.

A 2012 title in this league earned the club promotion to the Regionalliga West where it played until 2019 after being promoted to 3. Liga.

Merging history

1949–1957

1957–1994

1994–2002

2002–2010

22 June 2010

Honours
 Regionalliga West (IV)
Champions: 2016–17, 2018–19
 NRW-Liga (V)
 Champions: 2011–12
 Verbandsliga Mittelrhein (V)
 Champions: 1997–98
 Middle Rhine Cup (Tiers III-V)
 Winners: 2013–14, 2014–15, 2015–16, 2017–18, 2020–21, 2021–22

Players

Current squad

Out on loan

European participations
Inter-Cities Fairs Cup/UEFA Cup/UEFA Europa League:

Kit suppliers and shirt sponsors

References

External links
 

 
Football clubs in Cologne
Association football clubs established in 1904
1904 establishments in Germany
Football clubs in Germany
2. Bundesliga clubs
3. Liga clubs